In the Israel Defense Forces (IDF), a lone soldier (Ḥayal Boded) is defined as a serviceman or woman without immediate family in Israel. Lone soldiers serve in regular units and receive various forms of support from the IDF, Israeli government ministries and other organizations. Their exact number fluctuates over time, but is consistently in the thousands; the Jewish Telegraphic Agency reported in April 2012, that there were an "estimated 5,000". About 40% of them serve in combat units. They are generally either non-Israelis of Jewish background volunteering under the Mahal or Tzofim Garin Tzabar programmes, or immigrants under the Law of Return, although other possibilities exist (e.g. orphaned natives). According to an IDF spokeswoman, 8,217 personnel born outside Israel enlisted between 2009 and August 2012. The most represented countries of origin were Russia and the United States, with 1,685 and 1,661 recruits respectively.

Lone soldiers receive a higher basic salary from the IDF, as well as financial assistance from the Ministry of Immigrant Absorption and the Ministry of Housing and Construction. They are also given help with housing, and the right to extra time off, including 30 days per year to visit family overseas.

Organizations that help lone soldiers include the Lone Soldier Center in memory of Michael Levin, The Benji Hillman Foundation which offers housing and guidance for lone soldiers in Ra'anana, The FIDF/NBN Lone Soldiers Program, Jewish Agency and Chayal el Chayal. The Lone Soldier Center, which is open 24 hours a day, assists lone soldiers and their families overseas, provides meals on the Jewish Sabbath (Shabbat) and Jewish holidays, gives lone soldiers educational and social opportunities, and, where needed, helps them find adoptive families in Israel. The FIDF/NBN provides solutions caring for all immigrants and lone soldiers at all stages of the process: prior to arrival in Israel, prior to recruitment, throughout military service and after release from the IDF (if the released soldier remains in Israel as a civilian). Chayal el Chayal offers an at-home environment for future, present and past lone soldiers. They provide lodging, meals on the Jewish Sabbath and Jewish holidays, equipment and care packages, and items related to Judaism such as prayer-books and shawls.

Where a soldier's parents live in Israel, but he or she is not in contact with them, it is possible for him or her to be designated an "irregular lone soldier". In early 2011, The Jerusalem Post reported that about 46% of the approximately 5,000 lone soldiers in the military at that time had family in Israel, but were estranged from them. An IDF adviser to lone soldiers told Arutz Sheva in 2012 that most of these were youths from Haredi religious backgrounds, shunned by their families for joining the army. Irregular lone soldier status can also be given if both of an IDF soldier's parents are working abroad for the Israeli government. If a soldier marries while serving in the IDF, he or she loses lone soldier status. A lone soldier's benefits are also at risk if his or her parents themselves move to Israel.

Notable lone soldiers

Michael Levin, born and raised in Pennsylvania, USA moved to Israel in 2002, and joined the Paratroopers Brigade of the Israel Defense Forces. He was killed in action during the Second Lebanon War on 1 August 2006 in the Battle of Ayta ash-Shab. Levin's death received a great deal of attention; over 2,000 people attended his funeral on Mount Herzl in Jerusalem. Levin had told of an idea for a center for lone soldiers, which would provide them with meals, support and advice. With the support of Tziki Aud, a Jewish Agency employee who had known Levin, a group of former lone soldiers established the Lone Soldier Center in memory of Michael Levin in 2009.

During the 2014 Israel-Gaza conflict, three lone soldiers were killed: Max Steinberg and Sean Carmeli from the United States, and Jordan Bensemhoun from France. All three were killed in the Battle of Shuja'iyya.

Rights during IDF service
According to the Lone Soldier Center in memory of Michael Levin, a lone soldier in the Israel Defense Forces has the following rights while serving:

Financial assistance

Help with housing

Leaves

References

External links
Lone Soldier Center in memory of Michael Levin
Chayal el Chayal - The Lone Soldiers Home Away from Home
Tzofim Garin Tzabar - Lone Soldiers Program
The FIDF/NBN Lone Soldiers Program
The Jewish Agency for Israel
Lone soldiers at the official IDF website
Association for the Wellbeing of Israel's Soldiers
Friends of the Israel Defense Forces
HESEG Foundation
Mahal IDF Volunteers
Lone soldiers - anything but alone
The Benji Hillman Foundation - HaBayit shel Benji

Israel Defense Forces